Beriotisia is a genus of moths of the family Noctuidae.

Selected species
Beriotisia copahuensis (Köhler, 1967)
Beriotisia cuculliformis (Köhler, 1945)
Beriotisia fueguensis (Hampson, 1907)
Beriotisia taniae Angulo & Olivares, 1999
Beriotisia typhlina (Mabille, 1885)

References
Natural History Museum Lepidoptera genus database

Noctuinae